The 2010 All-Ireland Intermediate Hurling Championship was the 27th staging of the All-Ireland hurling championship since its establishment by the Gaelic Athletic Association in 1961. The championship began on 30 May 2010 and ended on 28 August 2010.

Cork were the defending champions, however, they were defeated by Kilkenny who won the title following a 2-17 to 1-13 victory in the final.

Team summaries

Results

Leinster Intermediate Hurling Championship

Munster Intermediate Hurling Championship

All-Ireland Intermediate Hurling Championship

Statistics

Top scorers

Overall

Single game

References

Intermediate
All-Ireland Intermediate Hurling Championship